The list of tunnels includes any road tunnel, railway tunnel or waterway tunnel anywhere in the world.

Afghanistan
 Salang Tunnel

Albania

Andorra
 Envalira Tunnel, road
 Pont Pla Tunnel, 1.26 km, road
 Sant Antoni Tunnel, 280 m, road
 Dos Valires Tunnel, 3 km, road

Argentina
 Cristo Redentor Tunnel
 Raúl Uranga – Carlos Sylvestre Begnis Subfluvial Tunnel

Australia

Austria

Azerbaijan
 Ziya Bunyadov tunnel Baku
 Darnagul tunnel Baku
 20 January tunnel Baku
 Kalbajar Tunnel

Belgium

Brazil

Bulgaria

Canada

Chile

People's Republic of China

Specifically notable tunnels in the People's Republic of China include:
 Line 6 (Chengdu Metro), 68.2 km (42.4 mi), longest metro/rapid transit tunnel
 Wushaoling Tunnel, 21 km long dual bore railway
 Zhongnanshan Tunnel, 18 km long dual bore roadway
 Fenghuoshan tunnel, at 5 km above sea level, the highest elevation rail tunnel in the world

Colombia
 Tunel del Toyo (under construction) 9.84 km 
 La Línea Tunnel 8.65 km
 Occidente Tunnel 4.6 km
 Buenavista Tunnel 4.6 km
 Sumapaz Tunnel 4.1 km
 Daza Tunnel 1.7 km
 Túnel Polvorín 1.6 km
 Girardota Tunnel 850 m
 La Llorona Tunnel 470 m
 Bijagual Tunnel 185 m
 Boquerón Tunnel 2.4 km
 Santa Rosa Tunnel 1.5 km
 Tunnel 5 1.6 km
 Tunnel 3 1.4 km
 Túnel Guacapate 1.2 km

Croatia

Denmark
 Great Belt Fixed Link, railway, 8.0 km
 Copenhagen Metro, metro rail, M2 line, 7,4 km (Fasanvej–Lergravsparken) 
 Øresund Connection, road and rail, 4.05 km
 Boulevard Line, Copenhagen, railway, 1.8 km
 Limfjordstunnelen

Egypt
 Ahmed Hamdi Tunnel, under the Suez Canal between Suez and Ismailia.

Estonia
 Ülemiste Tunnel, road, 320 m

Faroe Islands

Finland
 Raisiotunneli Raisio
 Myllyahde tunneli Turku
 Kehä II tunneli Kauniainen
 Korpilahti railway tunnel, near Jyväskylä
 Päijänne Water Tunnel, 1982
 Savio Rail Tunnel, 13.5 km, opened in 2008

France
 Channel Tunnel to the United Kingdom (railway through the English Channel), at 50.5 km (31.4 mi)
 International Tunnel de Bielsa-Aragnouet France – Spain: total length 3.07 km, diameter 7.5 m, 100 m minimum distance between one after another vehicles, asphalt lane 6 m wide, for vehicles high max 4.3 m, max speed 60 km/h (37 mi/h)
 Fréjus Rail Tunnel
 Fréjus Road Tunnel
 Mont Blanc Tunnel
 Pont de l'Alma Tunnel (built under the River Sena – along its length, perpendicular to the length of the bridge, with reinforced concrete columns between the two traffic lanes, road: forbidden for pedestrians)
 Rove Tunnel, southern section of the Marseilles–Rhône Canal, 7.2 km (4.5 mi) long and 22 m (72 ft) wide, Bouches-du-Rhône dept., SE France; opened 1927. Starting near the village of Le Rove, it cuts through the Chaîne de l'Estaque at sea level. It is considered one of the greatest pieces of engineering since the Panama Canal. Longest canal tunnel in the world.
 Col de Tende Road Tunnel

Georgia
 Roki Tunnel (3.73 km road)
 Rikoti Tunnel (1.72 km road)

Germany

e.g.:
 Rennsteig Tunnel
 Engelberg Tunnel
 Old Elbe Tunnel
 New Elbe Tunnel

Gibraltar
 Dudley Ward Tunnel

Greece
Road tunnel in operation:
 Aktio–Preveza Undersea Tunnel (road), Connects Aktio and Preveza, under Aktion Channel, 1.20 km
 Artemisio Tunnel (road), double tunnel, under Mount Artemision, 1.40 km
 76 tunnels of Egnatia motorway, most notably in parts of Epirus and Western Macedonia, combined length of 99 km, the longest of which are Driskos Tunnel 4.6 km, Metsovo Tunnel 3.5 km, Dodoni Tunnel 3.6 km, Kastania Tunnel 2.2 km, Anilio Tunnel 2.1 km
 Road Tunnels of E94 part Athens–Corinth, point Kakia Skala, combined length of 6 km

Road tunnel under construction:
 Tempe Tunnel
 Platamonas Tunnel

Railway tunnel in operation:
 Tempe Tunnel 5.5 km
 Platamonas Tunnel 4.3 km
 Perama Tunnel 3.5 km
 Kakia Skala Tunnel 2.4 km

Railway tunnel under construction:
 Kalidromos Tunnel
 Othrios Tunnel
 Domokos Tunnel
 Panagiopoulos Tunnel
 Aegio Tunnel

Hong Kong

Iceland

No metro, but some long road tunnels, including Hvalfjörður Tunnel at 5.8 km (3.6 mi) and some longer, and the longest (non-road) hydroelectric tunnel in Europe, one of  the longest tunnels of any kind in the world, at Kárahnjúkar Hydropower Plant at 39.7 km (24.7 mi)

India

 Dr. Syama Prasad Mookerjee Tunnel Longest Road Tunnel in India
 Atal Tunnel
 Banihal Qazigund Road Tunnel
 Pir Panjal Railway Tunnel (Banihal Tunnel)
 Maliguda Tunnel
 New Katraj Tunnel
 Punarjani Guha
 trivandrum port tunnel
 Jaipur Tunnel
 Kuthiran Tunnel
 Anakkampoyil-Kalladi-Meppadi tunnel
 Zoji-la Tunnel
 Sela Tunnel

Ireland

Isle of Man
 Great Laxey Mine Railway tunnel

Israel
 Carmel Tunnels
 Traffic Tunnels on road number 60 from Jerusalem to Gush Etzion
 Traffic Tunnels on road number 6 (crossing Israel)
 Railway tunnels (under construction) on new line Tel Aviv–Jerusalem
 Gaza Strip smuggling tunnels
 Siloam Tunnel
 Jerusalem Water Channel
 Western Wall Tunnel

Italy
 Fréjus Rail Tunnel
 Fréjus Road Tunnel
 Mont Blanc Tunnel
 Traforo del Gran Sasso
 Great St Bernard Tunnel
 Simplon Tunnel
 Col de Tende Road Tunnel

Japan

 Seikan Tunnel, 53.9 km (33.5 mi)

Lithuania
 Kaunas Railway Tunnel
 Paneriai Railway Tunnel

Luxembourg
 Gousselerbierg Tunnel
 Grouft Tunnel
 Markusbierg Tunnel
 René Konen Tunnel
 Stafelter Tunnel

Macau

 Túnel do Monte da Guia
 Túnel da Colina de Taipa Grande
 Túnel do Canal da Taipa

Macedonia
 Bukovik Tunnel, railway, 7.05 km

 veles tunnel 500 m 
 veles tunnel 300 m

 demir kapija tunnel 800 m

Malaysia
 SMART Tunnel – 3.3 km (highway); 9.7 km (water passage)
 Genting Sempah Tunnel – 900 m (highway)
 Larut Tunnel – 2.9 km (rail)
 Menora Tunnel – 800 m (highway)
 Penchala Tunnel – 700 m (highway)
 Kelana Jaya Line (light metro) – 2.9 km (underground rail section)
 Sungai Buloh–Kajang Line (light metro) – 9.5 km (underground rail section)
 Sungai Buloh–Serdang–Putrajaya Line (light metro) – 13.5 km (underground rail section)

Montenegro
Road tunnels in operation
 Sozina Tunnel 4.19 km
 Ivica Tunnel 2.21 km
 Sutorman Tunnel 1.97 km (used as railway tunnel from 1908 to 1959, very narrow, only one car, rarely used)
 Vrmac Tunnel 1.64 km
 Lokve Tunnel 1.12 km
 Budoš Tunnel

Road tunnels under construction
 Vjeternik Tunnel 3.0/2.86 km (two tubes)
 Klisura Tunnel 2.81 km
 Kosman Tunnel 2.67/2.55 km (two tubes)
 Vežešnik Tunnel 2.47/2.41 km (two tubes)
 Mala Trava Tunnel 1.90/1.88 km (two tubes)
 Jabučki Krš Tunnel 1.46/1.36 km (two tubes)
 Ibarac Tunnel 1.19 km

Railway tunnels in operation
 Sozina Tunnel 6.17 km
 Trebješica Tunnel 5.17 km
 Mojkovac Tunnel 3.24 km
 Ostravica Tunnel 3.13 km
 Šljivovica Tunnel 2.20 km

Morocco
 Tunnel du Legionaire

Netherlands

New Zealand

North Korea

Norway

Panama
 Las Esclavas Tunnel

Pakistan

Road tunnels in operation
 Attabad Tunnels, on N-35 Karakoram Highway is a series of five tunnels in Gilgit-Baltistan
 Abbottabad Tunnels on Hazara Motorway M-15
 Kohat Tunnel on N55 Indus Highway
 Lowari Tunnel on N-45 Nowshera-Chitral Highway
 Malakand Tunnel on N-45 Nowshera–Chitral Highway
 Nahakki Tunnel is a tunnel from Peshawar to Mohmand Agency via Bajaur
 Neelum–Jhelum Hydropower Tunnel
 Swat Tunnel on Nowshera–Swat Expressway
 Quetta Tunnel at the entrance of Quetta on N-25 National Highway near Lak Pass.

Railway tunnels in operation
 Khojak Tunnel, is a railway tunnel connecting Rohri with Chaman
 Lahore Metro Orange Line Tunnel in Lahore

Philippines
 Subic Tunnel (road)
 Marcos Highway Tunnel (road)
 Antipolo Tunnel (road)
 Cebu tunnel (road)
 Purle line tunnel (rail)

Poland
 "Tunel" ("the Tunnel"), 813 m, on the Warsaw–Kielce–Kraków line, between Sędziszów and Słomniki
 Wałbrzych–Jedlina, 1.60 km, rail
 Warsaw Metro rail
 Warsaw Cross-City Line, 2.31 km, rail
 Warsaw, road city tunnel (Wisłostrada), 930 m southbound, 889 m northbound
 Gdańsk, road under water tunnel, 1.38 km,  
 Laliki, road mountain tunnel, 678 m, 
 Kraków, road city tunnel, 230 m, 
 Kraków, tram city tunnel, 1.42 km,

Portugal

Puerto Rico
 Minillas Tunnel
 Vicente Morales Tunnel

Romania
 Teliu Rail Tunnel 4.37 km
 Talasmani Rail Tunnel 3.33 km
 Pasul Şetref Rail Tunnel 2.39 km
 Danes Rail Tunnel 969 m
 Capra-Bâlea Road Tunnel, 884 m (connects the historic regions of Transylvania and Wallachia), Transfăgărășan
 Sighisoara Rail Tunnel 401 m
 Sacel Highway Tunnel, 340 m, A1 motorway (Romania)
 Transfagarasan KM 60 Tunnel, 172 m, Transfăgărășan

Russia
 Severomuysky Tunnel (15.34 km), Buryatia
 Baikal (Daban) tunnel (6.69 km), Irkutsk Oblast
 Gimry tunnel (4.30 km), Dagestan
 Lefortovo tunnel, 3.2 km, Moscow
 North-Western Tunnel, 2.8 km, Moscow

Singapore
 Mass Rapid Transit (Singapore)
 Chin Swee Tunnel
 Kampong Java Tunnel
 Kallang–Paya Lebar Expressway
 Fort Canning Tunnel
 Marina Coastal Expressway

Slovakia

Slovenia
 Dekani Tunnel – 2.18/2.19 km, A1 road
 Golovec Tunnel – 530/595 m, A1 road/E57 road
 Kastelec Tunnel – 2.29/2.24 km, A1 road
 Karavanke Tunnel (Karawanken Tunnel) – 7.86 km, A2 road/E61 road
 Trojane Tunnel – 2.84/2.93 m, A1/E57 road
 Šentvid Tunnel – 1.07/1.05 m, A2/E61 road
 Bohinj Tunnel – 6.33 km, rail tunnel on the way Jesenice – Nova Gorica
 Tunnels on the Slovenian motorways

Spain

Sweden

Switzerland

 Gotthard Base Tunnel, 57.09 km (35.5 mi) railway tunnel through the Alps

Taiwan
 Hsuehshan Tunnel (National Highway No. 5)
 Baguashan Tunnel (Provincial Highway No. 76)
 Hu Kou Tunnel (Taiwan High Speed Railway)
 Taipei Metro
 Kaohsiung Mass Rapid Transit
 Chang–Feng Tunnel (長風隧道)
 Tsang–Chiao Tunnel (藏蛟隧道)
 Chai–Shan Tunnel (翟山隧道)

Tanzania
 TAZARA Railway – 22 tunnels;

Thailand

 Chong Khao Tunnel (235.90 m rail tunnel on Southern line in Nakhon Si Thammarat province)
 Huai Mae Lan Tunnel (130.20 m rail tunnel on Northern line in Phrae province)
 Khao Phang Hoei Tunnel (230.60 m rail tunnel on Northeastern line in Lopburi and Chaiyaphum provinces)
 Khao Phlueng Tunnel (362.44 m rail tunnel on Northern line in Uttaradit and Phrae provinces)
 Khun Tan Tunnel (1362.10 m rail tunnel on Northern line in Lampang and Lamphun provinces)
 Mongkolrit Tunnel (268 m road tunnel in Betong, Yala province)
 Pang Tup Khop Tunnel (120.09 m rail tunnel on Northern line in Uttaradit province)
 Phra Phutthachai Tunnel (1.20 km rail tunnel on freight-only Eastern line in Saraburi province)
 Mae Taeng–Mae Ngat–Mae Kuang Diversion Tunnel 23 km (waterway) underconstruction
 MRT Blue Line 25.8 km (underground rail section)
 MRT Orange Line 13.8 km (underground rail section) – underconstruction
 Khao Yai – Thap Lan Tunnel (250 m and 180 m road tunnel, total of 430 m in Prachinburi Province, for wildlife overpass)

Turkey

United Arab Emirates
 Airport Tunnel, Dubai (road)
 Al Shindagha Tunnel, Dubai (road)
 Wadi Al Helo Tunnel (between Sharjah – Kalba approximately 1.6 km)

United Kingdom

 Channel Tunnel to France (railway through the English Channel), at 50.5 km (31.4 mi)

United States

Vietnam
 Hải Vân Tunnel, the longest tunnel in Southeast Asia at 6.28 km (3.90 mi).
 Sài Gòn River Tunnel
 Cu Chi Tunnels

Zambia
 TAZARA Railway – 22 tunnels; longest

See also
 World's longest tunnels
 List of tunnels in the Alps

References

External links
 The world's longest tunnel page

Location